Augusto Francisco Rocha (born 7 February 1935 in Macau) is a former Portuguese footballer who played as a forward.

Football career 

Rocha gained 7 caps for Portugal and made his debut 13 April 1958 in Madrid against Spain, in a 0-1 defeat.

External links 
 
 

1935 births
Living people
Portuguese footballers
Portuguese people of Macanese descent
Association football forwards
Primeira Liga players
Sporting CP footballers
Associação Académica de Coimbra – O.A.F. players
Portugal international footballers